Cyclohexane-1,2-diol is a chemical compound found in castoreum.  It can exist in either cis- or trans-isomers.

The enzyme cyclohexane-1,2-diol dehydrogenase uses trans-cyclohexane-1,2-diol and NAD+ to produce 2-hydroxycyclohexan-1-one, NADH and H+.

References 

Vicinal diols